Jernej Župančič Regent (born May 18, 1980 in Žusterna, Koper) is a Slovenian sprint canoer who has competed since the mid-2000s. At the 2004 Summer Olympics in Athens, he was eliminated in the semifinals of the K-1 1000 m event. Four years later in Beijing, he was eliminated in the semifinals of the same event.

References
 Sports-Reference.com profile

1980 births
Canoeists at the 2004 Summer Olympics
Canoeists at the 2008 Summer Olympics
Living people
Olympic canoeists of Slovenia
Slovenian male canoeists
People from the City Municipality of Koper